The 2016 All Japan High School Soccer Tournament (All Japan JFA 95th High School Soccer Tournament (Japanese: 第95回全国高等学校サッカー選手権大会) marked the 95th edition of the referred annually contested cup for High Schools over Japan.

Calendar

Source:

Venues
The tournament was played in four prefectures and nine stadiums, with six (two for each prefecture) located in Chiba, Kanagawa, and Tokyo Prefectures, and three located in Saitama. They are:

Tokyo – Ajinomoto Field Nishigaoka, and Komazawa Olympic Park Stadium
Saitama – Saitama Stadium 2002, Urawa Komaba Stadium and NACK5 Stadium Omiya
Kanagawa – NHK Spring Mitsuzawa Football Stadium and Kawasaki Todoroki Stadium
Chiba – Fukuda Denshi Arena and Kashiwanoha Stadium

First round

Second round

Round of 16

Quarter-finals

Semi-finals

Final

References

Football competitions in Japan
Youth football competitions
2016 in Japanese football